Sdot, a Hebrew word meaning fields, may refer to the following places in Israel:

Sdot Micha
Sdot Negev Regional Council
Sdot Yam

Sdot may also refer to:

 Dot operator, a type of Interpunct